Lionel Grant Heinrich (April 20, 1934 – April 21, 2014) was a Canadian professional ice hockey player who played 35 games with the Boston Bruins of the National Hockey League during the 1955–56 NHL season. The rest of his career, which lasted from 1954 to 1962, was spent in various minor leagues.

Career statistics

Regular season and playoffs

References

External links

1934 births
2014 deaths
Boston Bruins players
Canadian ice hockey left wingers
Hershey Bears players
Ice hockey people from Saskatchewan
Quebec Aces (QSHL) players
Vancouver Canucks (WHL) players
Windsor Bulldogs (OHA) players